Kean Edward Uson Cipriano (born June 11, 1987 in Pasig City) is a Filipino singer, composer, actor, music video director, and musician. He is well known as the former vocalist of pop-rock band Callalily, and the founder of his own record label O/C Records.

Early and personal life
Kean Edward Uson Cipriano was born in Pasig City, Metro Manila, and has two younger brothers, Keno and Keano. He finished his high school education at Lourdes School of Mandaluyong. Cipriano attended the Conservatory of Music at the University of Santo Tomas and read business administration at the Entrepreneurs School of Asia (ESA).                                                                   
                                
In September 2015, Cipriano joined as a celebrity player of Your Face Sounds Familiar 2.

In October 2015, Cipriano confirmed his relationship with actress Chynna Ortaleza on Tonight with Boy Abunda. Two months later, on New Year's Eve, the couple announced their marriage. The couple had a daughter in 2016.

On March 17, 2016, his father, Edgie Cipriano died due to cardiac arrest.

Career
He was part of ABS-CBN's noontime show Magandang Tanghali Bayan and won opposite Trixie Cacho on the "Luv Idol" segment.

In 2010, Cipriano began his acting career via the TV5 series BFGF with Alex Gonzaga followed by a sitcom titled, Hapi Together.

In 2011, Cipriano expanded his acting career by starring in his first movie together with Eugene Domingo titled, Ang Babae Sa Septic Tank where he played Rainier, a director. He also made several guest appearances in late morning series, Showtime aired over at the ABS-CBN Network, it is there that he met his close friend, Vice Ganda, the two later topbilled The Unkabogable Praybeyt Benjamin which became the highest grossing Filipino film of all-time. In the same year he appeared in his first independent film titled, San Lazaro. He starred in his own television drama that aired on TV5 titled, P.S. I Love You with Gonzaga.

In 2012, Cipriano starred in a film titled The Reunion to be released by Star Cinema together with Enchong Dee, Enrique Gil and Xian Lim with Bangs Garcia as his leading-lady.

He used to be a freelancer, appearing in projects of (but without any formal association with) the three largest television networks when he first entered the showbiz. Currently, he is a talent of ABS-CBN.

In 2013, Cipriano won the one-million peso briefcase in Kapamilya, Deal or No Deal together with Enchong Dee. On June 5, it was announced that he will take part on the second Philippine Popular Music Festival together with Banda ni Kleggy as the interpreters for the song called "Space" written by Raffy Calicdan.

In 2015, Cipriano teamed up with Nadine Lustre, to interpret Mark Villar's "Sa Ibang Mundo", an entry to the 4th Philippine Popular Music Festival held at Meralco Theater on July 25, 2015.

In 2018, Cipriano and Ortaleza co-founded O/C Records, an independent label collaborating with Viva Records. O/C's lineup of artist/band roster includes former IV of Spades vocalist Unique Salonga.

During an interview on June 23, 2022, Cipriano said that Callalily is "done" after 17 years of being the band's frontman, stating that he is not in good terms with the rest of the band members anymore but still wishes them the best, while at the same time, also focusing on his own record label.

Discography

With Callalily
Destination XYZ (2006)
Fisheye (2008)
Callalily (2009)
Flower Power (2012)
Greetings From Callalily (2015)

With BBS (Big Band Syndicate)
Ctrl+Alt+Del.Restart (2011)

As a solo artist
Childlike (album, 2021) - O/C Records
Tayuman (single; 2022)

Filmography

Movies

Television

Music video director

Film director

Awards and nominations

References

External links
Official website

1987 births
21st-century Filipino male singers
Filipino male film actors
Filipino male comedians
People from Pasig
Singers from Metro Manila
Living people
University of Santo Tomas alumni
ABS-CBN personalities
Filipino male television actors
Filipino music video directors